The New South Wales Under-18's rugby league team, also known as New South Wales Under-18's or New South Wales U18, represents New South Wales in the sport of rugby league at an under-18 age level. Since 2008, the team has played an annual fixture against the Queensland Under-18's team as a curtain raiser to a State of Origin game. The team features players selected from New South Wales's premier under-18 rugby league competition, the S.G. Ball Cup. They are administered by the New South Wales Rugby League.

History 
Prior to 2008, junior interstate matches were contested at under-17 and under-19 levels. In 2008, with the advent of the National Youth Competition, the age levels switched to an under-16 and under-18 format to keep in line with the NSWRL's existing SG Ball Cup and Harold Matthews Cup competitions and the QRL's Mal Meninga Cup and Cyril Connell Cup competitions, which would begin in 2009.

New South Wales saw success in the first four under-18 Origin fixtures, winning every game until 2012. New South Wales would win another two more fixtures in 2013 and 2014 before picking up their second lose in 2015, losing to Queensland 22-18 at the Melbourne Cricket Ground. Since 2015 New South Wales have won every under-18 Origin fixture, in 2016, 2017 and 2018.

Players 
Players selected for the New South Wales under-18 team are usually contracted with a National Rugby League (NRL) side but play in either the S.G. Ball Cup, Holden Cup or Intrust Super Premiership competitions. Each pre-season the New South Wales Rugby League will select an under-18 squad featuring players in contention for the mid-season fixture.

Notable players 
Since 2008, fifteen former New South Wales under-18 players have gone onto represent New South Wales at State of Origin level:

 Josh Dugan
 Wade Graham
 William Hopoate
 Aaron Woods
 David Klemmer
 Jake Trbojevic
 Jack Bird
 Latrell Mitchell
 Tom Trbojevic
 Nick Cotric
 Payne Haas
 Cameron Murray
 Jack Wighton
 Dale Finucane
 Clint Gutherson

Results

2008 
Played as a curtain raiser to Game II of the 2008 State of Origin series.

2009 
Played as a curtain raiser to Game II of the 2009 State of Origin series.

2010 
Played as a curtain raiser to Game II of the 2010 State of Origin series.

2011 
Played as a curtain raiser to Game II of the 2011 State of Origin series.

2012 
Played as a curtain raiser to Game III of the 2012 State of Origin series.

2013 
Played as a curtain raiser to Game II of the 2013 State of Origin series.

2014 
Played as a curtain raiser to Game II of the 2014 State of Origin series.

2015 
Played as a curtain raiser to Game II of the 2015 State of Origin series.

2016 
Played as a curtain raiser to Game II of the 2016 State of Origin series.

2017 
Played as a curtain raiser to Game II of the 2017 State of Origin series.

2018 
Played as a curtain raiser to Game I of the 2018 State of Origin series.

See also 

 New South Wales State team
 New South Wales Residents team
 New South Wales Women's team
New South Wales Under-20 team
New South Wales Under-16 team
Australian Schoolboys team
 S.G. Ball Cup
 New South Wales Rugby League
 Country Rugby League

References 

New South Wales rugby league team